WDID-LD, virtual channel 26 (UHF digital channel 33), is a low-power Novelisima-affiliated television station licensed to Savannah, Georgia, United States. The station is owned by HC2 Holdings.

History 
The station's construction permit was issued in 2015 under the calls of W15EN-D. The current callsign of WDID-LD was adapted on November 10, 2014.

Subchannels

References

External links

Innovate Corp.
Low-power television stations in the United States
DID-LD
Television channels and stations established in 2015
2015 establishments in Georgia (U.S. state)